The Hastings 1895 chess tournament was a round-robin tournament of chess conducted at the Brassey Institute in Hastings, England from 5 August to 2 September 1895.

Hastings 1895 was arguably the strongest tournament in history at the time it occurred.  All of the top players of the generation competed.  It was one of the first times such a "super-tournament" was conducted.

Harry Nelson Pillsbury, a young American unknown in Europe, was the surprise winner with 16½ out of 21 points – ahead of Mikhail Chigorin (16) and world champion Emanuel Lasker (15½). The top five finishers were invited to play in the Saint Petersburg 1895–96 chess tournament.

Following the success of the event, the Hastings tournament would become an annual feature. The organizers and players produced a Book of the Tournament, in which the participants annotated their own games. Like the Tournament, the Book too became an annual feature and was of very high instructional value.

Tournament table

{| class="wikitable" style="text-align: center;"
|+ Hastings 1895
!# !!Player !!1!!2!!3!!4!!5!!6!!7!!8!!9!!10!!11!!12!!13!!14!!15!!16!!17!!18!!19!!20!!21!!22!!Total
|-
| 1 || align=left|
| X||0||0||1||1||1||1||1||0||½||½||1||1||1||1||1||1||½||1||1||1||1||16½
|-
| 2 || align=left|
| 1||X||1||1||0||0||1||1||1||1||½||0||1||1||1||½||½||1||1||½||1||1||16
|-
| 3 || align=left| 
| 1||0||X||0||1||1||0||1||1||0||1||1||½||1||1||1||½||1||1||½||1||1||15½
|-
| 4 || align=left|
| 0||0||1||X||1||1||½||0||½||1||1||1||0||1||½||1||1||1||0||½||1||1||14
|-
|  5 || align=left|
| 0||1||0||0||X||1||1||½||½||1||1||0||1||½||1||0||1||1||0||½||1||1||13
|-
| 6 || align=left|
| 0||1||0||0||0||X||½||½||0||1||1||1||½||½||1||1||0||½||1||½||1||1||12
|-
| 7 || align=left|
| 0||0||1||½||0||½||X||½||½||0||0||½||1||1||1||½||½||1||1||1||0||1||11½
|-
| 8 || align=left|
| 0||0||0||1||½||½||½||X||½||0||0||½||1||1||0||1||½||1||½||1||1||1||11½
|-
| 9 || align=left|
| 1||0||0||½||½||1||½||½||X||½||½||0||1||1||½||½||½||½||½||½||1||0||11
|-
| 10 || align=left|
| ½||0||1||0||0||0||1||1||½||X||0||1||0||1||0||½||1||0||1||0||1||1||10½
|-
| 11 || align=left|
| ½||½||0||0||0||0||1||1||½||1||X||0||½||0||½||½||0||½||½||1||1||1||10
|-
| 12 || align=left|
| 0||1||0||0||1||0||½||½||1||0||1||X||½||0||0||½||0||1||½||1||0||1||9½
|-
| 13 || align=left|
| 0||0||½||1||0||½||0||0||0||1||½||½||X||1||0||1||½||0||1||1||0||1||9½
|-
| 14 || align=left|
| 0||0||0||0||½||½||0||0||0||0||1||1||0||X||0||½||1||1||1||1||1||1||9½
|-
| 15 || align=left|
| 0||0||0||½||0||0||0||1||½||1||½||1||1||1||X||0||1||½||0||1||0||0||9
|-
| 16 || align=left|
| 0||½||0||0||1||0||½||0||½||½||½||½||0||½||1||X||1||½||0||½||½||1||9
|-
| 17 || align=left|
| 0||½||½||0||0||1||½||½||½||0||1||1||½||0||0||0||X||0||0||1||1||½||8½
|-
| 18 || align=left|
| ½||0||0||0||0||½||0||0||½||1||½||0||1||0||½||½||1||X||1||1||0||½||8½
|-
| 19 || align=left|
| 0||0||0||1||1||0||0||½||½||0||½||½||0||0||1||1||1||0||X||0||0||1||8
|-
| 20 || align=left|
| 0||½||½||½||½||½||0||0||½||1||0||0||0||0||0||½||0||0||1||X||1||1||7½
|-
| 21 || align=left|
| 0||0||0||0||0||0||1||0||0||0||0||1||1||0||1||½||0||1||1||0||X||1||7½
|-
| 22 || align=left|
| 0||0||0||0||0||0||0||0||1||0||0||0||0||0||1||0||½||½||0||0||0||X||3
|}

Notable games

Many of the games were of high quality and hard-fought. Here are two examples:

Steinitz versus von Bardeleben

In round ten, the position in the diagram arose after a Giuoco Piano: 1.e4 e5 2.Nf3 Nc6 3.Bc4 Bc5 4.c3 Nf6 5.d4 exd4 6.cxd4 Bb4+ 7.Nc3 d5 8.exd5 Nxd5 9.0-0 Be6 10.Bg5 Be7 11.Bxd5 Bxd5 12.Nxd5 Qxd5 13.Bxe7 Nxe7 14.Re1 f6 15.Qe2 Qd7 16.Rac1 c6 17.d5! cxd5 18.Nd4 Kf7 19.Ne6 Rhc8 20.Qg4 g6 21.Ng5+ Ke8. At this point Steinitz played one of the most famous moves in history:

22. Rxe7+  
Black cannot capture the white rook: 22...Qxe7 23.Rxc8+ Rxc8 24.Qxc8+ Qd8 25.Qxd8+, etc. and White wins with his extra piece; while 22...Kxe7 23.Re1+ Kd6 24.Qb4+ Rc5 25.Re6+! wins as well (the often-mentioned 25.Ne6 doesn't amount to much, for example 25...Rc8 26.Qf4+ Kc6 27.Qa4+ Kd6).  White's replies are also limited, however, because Black is threatening mate with ...Rxc1, as well as threatening to capture White's queen and knight. In order to prevent ...Rxc1, Steinitz's rook now "thumbs its nose" at the black king: repeatedly checking right in front of the king, which cannot capture it.

22... Kf8 23. Rf7+ Kg8 24. Rg7+ Kh8 25. Rxh7+!!
This crucial move eliminates the h-pawn and allows White to bring in his queen to attack without ever allowing Black to play ...Rxc1 and mate. Bowing to the inevitable (or perhaps frustrated that even with mate in one, he could not capitalize), von Bardeleben simply left the tournament hall, letting his time run out. Steinitz demonstrated for the spectators how the game might have continued: 25...Kg8 26.Rg7+ Kh8 27.Qh4+ Kxg7 28.Qh7+ Kf8 29.Qh8+ Ke7 30.Qg7+ Ke8 31.Qg8+ Ke7 32.Qf7+ Kd8 33.Qf8+ Qe8 34.Nf7+ Kd7 35.Qd6

This game won the first  in the tournament.

Pillsbury versus Gunsberg

The game was played in the last round. Pillsbury was leading the field by half a point. He had assumed that a draw would be enough, and the game therefore opened with the relatively placid Queen's Gambit Declined. Pieces were rapidly traded off the board, reaching the position in the diagram, when Pillsbury realized that Chigorin was winning his game and therefore he would have to win to take clear first.

1.d4 d5 2.c4 c6 3.e3 g6 4.Nc3 Bg7 5.Nf3 Nf6 6.Bd3 0-0 7.Ne5 dxc4 8.Bxc4 Nd5 9.f4 Be6 10.Qb3 b5 11.Bxd5 Bxd5 12.Nxd5 Qxd5 13.Qxd5 cxd5 14.Nd3 Nd7 15.Bd2 Rfc8 16.Ke2 e6 17.Rhc1 Bf8 18.Rxc8 Rxc8 19.Rc1 Rxc1 20.Bxc1 Bd6 21.Bd2 Kf8 22.Bb4 Ke7 23.Bc5 a6 24.b4 f6 25.g4 Bxc5 26.bxc5 Nb8 (diagram) 27.f5 g5 28.Nb4 a5 29.c6! Kd6 30.fxe6! Nxc6 31.Nxc6 Kxc6 32.e4! dxe4 33.d5+ Kd6 34.Ke3 b4 35.Kxe4 a4 36.Kd4 h5 37.gxh5 a3 38.Kc4 f5 39.h6 f4 40.h7  Black resigned.

Notes

References

External links
 Google Books:  Horace F. Cheshire, ed., The Hastings Chess Tournament 1895... (London, England:  Chatto & Windus, 1896).
 Hastings 1895 games at muljadi.org
 Hastings 1895 at ChessGames.com
 Steinitz vs. Von Bardeleben, Hastings 1895 at ChessGames.com
Edward Winter, Steinitz v von Bardeleben
 Pillsbury vs. Gunsberg, Hastings 1895 at ChessGames.com

Chess competitions
Chess in England
1895 in English sport
1895 in chess
History of East Sussex
19th century in Sussex
August 1895 sports events
September 1895 sports events
Sport in Hastings